Dr. Seshagiri Rao Vellanki is an Indian scientist and is former distinguished scientist and associate director of the Satish Dhawan Space Centre (SDSC), Indian Space Research Organisation (ISRO). He worked in ISRO for more than 39 years in various capacities. In addition to that, he also served in ISRO as Prof. Satish Dhawan for three years. He is instrumental in setting up state of the art Real Time Systems and computer network for flight safety at SDSC SHAR. He is also responsible in developing data processing software required for displaying flight trajectory. He is a specialist in Kalman Filter. Pulse Coherent Mono-pulse Radars (PCMC) development and commissioning was carried under his leadership. He also developed and implemented various algorithms required for wind profile estimation for weather monitoring. He also worked extensively in Mission Simulations and Post flight trajectory estimation and data analytics. Implemented Expert System for Range Safety. Developed special techniques for dynamic calibration of Radars and Telemetry ground stations.
 
He has worked as Deputy Director, Range Operations (RO), Deputy Director, Vehicle Assembly and Static Test (VAST) Facility. He also served as Controller SDSC SHAR. He has greatly contributed for Satellite recovery experiment, Chandrayan-1, Mangalyaan  and many other missions.
ISRO’s prestigious Multi Object Tracking Radar (MOTR)  was designed, developed and commissioned under his guidance as Project Director. He is responsible in developing and implementing Software for Comuterisation Of Working Administrative areas for ISRO in all centres.
He has visited number of colleges and universities for delivering motivated talks to students in science and technology.

Personal life
Dr. Seshagiri Rao is born on 10 January 1953, at Kolavennu village, Krishna District of Andhra Pradesh. He completes his schooling at Elementary school and Zilla Parishad High School at Kolavennu village in Telugu Medium. He completed his Pre-University Course (PUC) in 1969 at A.C. College, Guntur. He is a B.Sc. graduate from J.K.C College, Guntur in 1972. Later he took his post-graduation M.Sc. (Physics – Electronics) from Andhra University, Visakhapatnam in 1974. Joined as Junior Research Fellow (JRF) in Andhra University and ultimately took his Ph.D. degree from Sri Venkateshwara University, Tirupati. 
Currently staying at Hyderabad, Telangana state and helping various academic, scientific and IT institutions in various research activities.

Positions held 
Held various positions at SDSC SHAR ISRO
 Chairman, STAnding Review Committee for Software Development(STARS)   1998 – 2018
 Prof Satish Dhawan Professor                                   2015 - 2018 
 Associate Director              	    		       2013 – 2015
 Controller                          	   		       2008 – 2010, 2012 – 2013
 Deputy Director, Range Operations		               2008 – 2014
 Project Director, Multi Object Tracking Radar (MOTR)           2009 – 2015
 Deputy Director, Vehicle Assembly and Static Testing (VAST)    2011 – 2012
 General Manager, Mission Analysis and Range Safety (MARS)      2012 – 2014
 General Manager, Range Instrumentation Systems (RIS)           2013 – 2014
 General Manager, SHAR Computer Facility (SCOF)                 2005 – 2008
 Deputy General Manager, SHAR Computer Facility (SCOF)          2001 – 2005 
 Manager, Real Time Data Processing                             1998 - 2001

Academic and research activities
He published more than 60 papers (Author & Co-author) in national and international journals, seminars and conferences.

References

External links 

People from Krishna district
1953 births
Scientists from Andhra Pradesh
Living people